This list of geological features on Ariel itemizes the named geological features on the moon of Uranus called Ariel. Nearly all of the features are named for bright spirits of world mythologies. All information in the tables below comes from the United States Geological Survey.

Valleys 
The grooves running along the median line of chasmata are called valles.

Chasms 
Arielian graben are called chasmata.

Craters

References 

Ariel (moon)
Ariel